CBS Storybreak is a Saturday morning anthology television series that originally aired on the CBS network from 1985 to 1989. Hosted by Bob Keeshan (and in its 1993 return by Malcolm-Jamal Warner), the episodes are half-hour animated adaptations of children's books published at the time of airing, including How to Eat Fried Worms. Other episodes included Dragon's Blood and Ratha's Creature. The show grew out of a feature on Keeshan's Captain Kangaroo series.

Unique for an American television series, the series featured open captions captioned by the National Captioning Institute for the hearing impaired during its 1993 reairing, instead of the usual closed captioning. In addition to being a convenience for the hearing-impaired, this also allowed those who could hear to read along with the story.

The episodes were produced by Australia's Southern Star/Hanna-Barbera Australia for CBS Entertainment Productions.

One of its crew members, Sander Schwartz,  became the president of Warner Bros. Animation in 2002.

Select episodes were released on home video in 1992 under the title Video Storybreak.

CBS' first in-house cartoon series since their original Terrytoons, it was nominated for an Emmy for Outstanding Animated Program in the 1985–1986 season. It continued in reruns until 1988 and returned to air in reruns (with Jamal-Warner replacing Keeshan as host) from the 1993–94 season to 1997–98 season.

The series featured regular Read More About It project selections from the Library of Congress in Washington DC, that were highlighted at the end of show by both Keeshan and Jamal-Warner.

Episodes

Season 1 (1985)

Season 2 (1985)

Season 3 (1987–1989)

International syndication
Network Ten (Australia)
Channel 5 (Singapore)

See also
The Pagemaster, a film with a similar premise

References

External links

 
http://www.retrojunk.com/details_tvshows/381-cbs-storybreak/
CBS Storybreak Info and Videos at The Retroist

 
1980s American animated television series
1980s American anthology television series
1985 American television series debuts
1989 American television series endings
1990s American animated television series
1990s American anthology television series
1993 American television series debuts
1994 American television series endings
American children's animated anthology television series
American children's animated education television series
1985 Australian television series debuts
1989 Australian television series endings
1990s Australian animated television series
1993 Australian television series debuts
1994 Australian television series endings
Australian children's animated education television series
English-language television shows
CBS original programming
Reading and literacy television series
Television series by CBS Studios
Television series by Hanna-Barbera
Television series by Endemol Australia
American television series revived after cancellation
American television series with live action and animation
Australian television series revived after cancellation
Australian television series with live action and animation